Sherwood Stewart (born June 6, 1946) is a former professional tennis player who was active in the 1970s and 1980s. Stewart was ranked as high as No. 60 in the world in singles on the ATP Rankings on December 31, 1978, and No. 4 in doubles on January 3, 1983.

He attended Lamar University in Beaumont, Texas and graduated in 1969. He was the NCAA College Division Singles Champion in 1967 and was inducted into the Lamar University Hall of Honor.

He won 52 doubles titles, the biggest of them coming at the 1984 Australian Open, the 1976 French Open and 1982 French Open, in Cincinnati in 1974, in Monte Carlo in 1984, and in Hamburg in 1976. He was also in three additional Grand Slam doubles finals during his career.

After retiring from playing, he became a coach, most notably of Zina Garrison.

Grand Slam finals

Doubles, 6 (3 wins, 3 losses)

Mixed Doubles, 4 (2 wins, 2 losses)

Career finals

Doubles (53 wins, 48 losses)

References

External links
 
 
 

1946 births
Living people
People from Baytown, Texas
American male tennis players
Australian Open (tennis) champions
French Open champions
Lamar Cardinals and Lady Cardinals athletes
People from Montgomery County, Texas
Tennis people from Texas
Grand Slam (tennis) champions in mixed doubles
Grand Slam (tennis) champions in men's doubles
Sportspeople from Harris County, Texas